Meka is a village near Roingin Lower Dibang Valley district of Arunachal Pradesh which is a state in India.

References

Villages in Lower Dibang Valley district